Open Road Integrated Media or ORIM (stylized as OR/M and also called Open Road) is a digital media company in New York City that was created by Jane Friedman and Jeffrey Sharp in 2009 with a focus on publishing ebook editions of older works of literature and nonfiction. In addition to its ebook publishing business, Open Road Integrated Media is the parent company of book publisher Open Road Media and content brands Early Bird Books,  The Lineup, The Archive, Murder & Mayhem, A Love So True, and  The Portalist.

Media veteran Paul Slavin joined the company as president in 2015 and was named CEO in 2016.

History
Former HarperCollins CEO Jane Friedman and film producer Jeffrey Sharp launched Open Road Integrated Media with the goal of bringing backlist books back to life in digital formats and partnering with writers of contemporary and classic works. The Open Road Media catalog includes authors such as William Styron, Pat Conroy, Samuel R. Delany, Alice Walker, John Ashbery, Octavia Butler, Robin McKinley, Michael Chabon, Sherman Alexie, Pearl S. Buck, Elizabeth Lynn and Dee Brown.

After acquiring the content of independent publishers E-Reads and Premier Digital in 2014, and signing deals with other publishers and authors, the Open Road Media catalog expanded to 10,000 titles by 2015.

In 2016 it partnered with OverDrive, Inc. to provide browser-based ebooks to elementary school libraries.

The independent Cambridge,UK ebook publisher Bloodhound Books was acquired in July 2021.

Imprints
 Open Road Media
 Open Road Media Young Readers
 Bloodhound Books

References

External links
  Corporate website
 Open Road Media ebook publishing
 Bloodhound Books - UK ebook publisher division

Publishing companies established in 2009
Publishing companies based in New York City
American companies established in 2009
2009 establishments in New York City